Snow White is a 1916 American silent romantic fantasy film directed by J. Searle Dawley. It was adapted by Winthrop Ames from his own 1912 Broadway play Snow White and the Seven Dwarfs, which was in turn adapted from the 1812 fairy tale (as collected by the Grimm brothers). The film stars Marguerite Clark and Creighton Hale, Clark reprising her stage role.

Fifteen years old when he saw it, Walt Disney was inspired to make it the subject of his first feature-length animated film in 1937.

Cast
Marguerite Clark as Snow White
Creighton Hale as Prince Florimond 
Dorothy Cumming as Queen Brangomar
Lionel Braham as Berthold the Huntsman 
Alice Washburn as Witch Hex (*see below)
Richard Barthelmess as Pie Man
Arthur Donaldson as King
Irwin Emmer as Dwarf
Billy Platt as Dwarf
Herbert Rice as Dwarf
Jimmy Rosen as Dwarf

uncredited
May Robson as Witch Hex (she replaced originally scheduled Alice Washburn)
Kate Lester as a dowager queen

Preservation status
Formerly thought to have been destroyed in a vault fire and presumed lost, a "substantially complete" print with Dutch intertitles, missing a few scenes, was found in Amsterdam in 1992 and restored at George Eastman House.

Home media
Snow White is included in the boxed DVD set Treasures from American Film Archives: 50 Preserved Films (2000).

See also
1916 in film

References

External links

1916 films
1910s romantic fantasy films
American black-and-white films
American films based on plays
American romantic fantasy films
American silent feature films
Articles containing video clips
Famous Players-Lasky films
Films about royalty
Films based on Snow White
Films directed by J. Searle Dawley
Paramount Pictures films
1910s rediscovered films
Rediscovered American films
Santa Claus in film
1910s American films
Silent horror films